Marcelo García or Marcelino García (little Marcelo) may refer to:
Marcelo Garcia (grappler) (born 1983), Brazilian Jiu-Jitsu competitor and submission grappler
Marcelo García Morales (born 1969), Mexican politician
Marcelino García Toral (born 1965), Spanish football coach
Marcelino García (cyclist) (born 1971), Spanish professional road bicycle racer
Marcelino García (boxer), boxer at the 1976 Summer Olympics from United States Virgin Islands

See also
Marcelo
García (disambiguation)